Cameraria macrocarpella is a moth of the family Gracillariidae. It is known from Ontario and Quebec in Canada, and New Jersey, Texas, Maine, Maryland, New York, Illinois and Vermont in the United States.

The wingspan is 8.5–9 mm.

The larvae feed on Castanea species and Quercus macrocarpa. They mine the leaves of their host plant. The mine has the form of a blotch mine on the upperside of the leaf.

References

External links
mothphotographersgroup

Cameraria (moth)
Moths described in 1878

Moths of North America
Lepidoptera of Canada
Lepidoptera of the United States
Leaf miners
Taxa named by Heinrich Frey
Taxa named by Jacob Boll